La Roche, LaRoche or Laroche may refer to:

People
LaRoche (surname), includes Laroche
Sophie von La Roche, a German writer
Marquis de La Roche-Helgomarche or Marquis de La Roche-Mesgouez, title held by Troilus de Mesqouez and linked to La Roche-Maurice
La Roche (musician)

Companies
Laroche Wines, French wine company
Hoffmann-La Roche, Swiss healthcare company

Places

Belgium
La Roche-en-Ardenne, a small town in the Ardennes

Canada

 La Roche is a township in Quebec

France
La Roche-Bernard, in the Morbihan département
La Roche-Blanche, Puy-de-Dôme, in the Puy-de-Dôme département
La Roche-Blanche, Loire-Atlantique, in the Loire-Atlantique département
La Roche-Canillac, in the Corrèze département
La Roche-Chalais, in the Dordogne département
La Roche-Clermault, in the Indre-et-Loire département
La Roche-de-Glun, in the Drôme département
La Roche-de-Rame, in the Hautes-Alpes département
La Roche-Derrien, in the Côtes-d'Armor département
La Roche-des-Arnauds, in the Hautes-Alpes département
La Roche-en-Brenil, in the Côte-d'Or département
La Roche-Guyon, in the Val-d'Oise département
La Roche-l'Abeille, in the Haute-Vienne département
La Roche-Mabile, in the Orne département
La Roche, Maré, on Maré Island, New Caledonia
La Roche-Maurice, in the Finistère département
La Roche-Morey, in the Haute-Saône département
La Roche-Noire, in the Puy-de-Dôme département
La Roche-Posay, in the Vienne département
La Roche-Rigault, in the Vienne département
Laroche-Saint-Cydroine, in Yonne dėpartement
La Roche-sur-Foron, in the Haute-Savoie département
La Roche-sur-Grane, in the Drôme département
La Roche-sur-le-Buis, in the Drôme département
La Roche-sur-Yon, in the Vendée département
La Roche-Vanneau, in the Côte-d'Or département
La Roche-Vineuse, in the Saône-et-Loire département
Baulme-la-Roche, in the Côte-d'Or département
Beaulieu-sous-la-Roche, in the Vendée département
Colroy-la-Roche, in the Bas-Rhin département
Neuviller-la-Roche, in the Bas-Rhin département
Saint-André-de-la-Roche, in the Alpes-Maritimes département
Saint-Bazile-de-la-Roche, in the Corrèze département
Saint-Blaise-la-Roche, in the Bas-Rhin département
Saint-Cyr-la-Roche, in the Corrèze département
Saint-Laurent-la-Roche, in the Jura département
Saint-Paul-la-Roche, in the Dordogne département
Saint-Pierre-la-Roche, in the Ardèche département
Saint-Priest-la-Roche, in the Loire département

Haiti
La Roche, Grand'Anse, a village in the Moron commune.

Switzerland
La Roche, Fribourg
Roche, Vaud

United States
LaRoche College in suburban Pittsburgh
LaRoche, South Dakota

Other
La Roche (horse), a Thoroughbred racehorse
Laroche-Migennes station, serving Laroche-Saint-Cydroine and Migennes, France

See also
Hoffmann-La Roche
La Roche-Posay, a cosmetics brand owned by L'Oréal